The Patria Cinema, located at 12-14 Bulevardul Magheru, was among the best-known movie theatres in Bucharest, Romania. It is housed in Horia Creangă's modernist 10-story ARO building (named after the insurance firm that had it built), designed in 1929 and completed in 1931. It was closed in November 2015, due to seismic risk.

Notes

External links 
Website Cinema Patria

Cinemas in Romania